Claud Hamilton, 1st Lord Paisley (3 June 1546 – 3 May 1621) was a Scottish nobleman who fought at the Battle of Langside in 1568 for Mary, Queen of Scots. He is the ancestor of the earls, marquesses and dukes of Abercorn.

Birth and origins 
Claud was born in 1546 (baptised 9 June), probably at Paisley, Scotland. He was the youngest son of James Hamilton and his wife Margaret Douglas. His father was the 2nd Earl of Arran in Scotland and 1st Duke of Châtellerault in France. His father's family descended from Walter FitzGilbert, the founder of the House of Hamilton, who had received the barony of Cadzow from Robert the Bruce in the 14th century. Claud's mother was a daughter of James Douglas, 3rd Earl of Morton. Both parents were Scottish. They had married in September 1532. Claud had four brothers and four sisters, who are listed in his father's article.

Commendator of Paisley 
His uncle John Hamilton, an illegitimate son of his grandfather, the 1st Earl of Arran, was commendatory abbot of Paisley Abbey around the time of his birth. In 1553 this uncle succeeded David Beaton as Archbishop of St Andrews and agreed to pass the position as commendator to his nephew Claud, who was then about seven years old.

Scottish politics and the Battle of Langside 
In March 1560, when he was 14, Hamilton was sent as a hostage to England to guarantee the Treaty of Berwick.

He and his family were Catholics and supporters of Mary, Queen of Scots. On 2 May 1568, he helped her escape from Loch Leven Castle and on 13 May fought for her at Langside where the Queen's men were defeated by Moray, the regent. He had commanded the vanguard of her army during the battle. His estates having been forfeited because of condemnation, Hamilton was concerned in the murder of the Regent Moray in 1570, and also in that of the next Regent, Matthew Stewart, 4th Earl of Lennox, in the following year; but in 1573 he recovered his estates.

Marriage and children 

On 1 August 1574 at Niddry Castle, Hamilton married Margaret Seton, the daughter of George Seton, 7th Lord Seton and his wife, Isabel Hamilton. Among her siblings were Robert Seton, 1st Earl of Winton; Sir John Seton of Barnes, attendant to the Earl of Leicester in 1575, Master Carver to Philip II of Spain and Master of Horse to James VI; Alexander Seton, 1st Earl of Dunfermline, Lord Urquhart, Lord Fyvie, and Prior of Pluscarden; and Sir William Seton, who married Janet Dunbar.

 
Claud and Margaret had five sons:
 James (1575–1618), was created the 1st Earl of Abercorn in 1603
 John, married Johanna Everard, daughter of Levimus Everard
 Claud (died 1614), of Shawfield, was appointed to the Privy Council of Ireland, and whose daughter Margaret married Sir John Stewart of Methven
 George (died before 1657) of Greenlaw and Roscrea, married twice and lived at Derrywoon
 Frederick (1590–1647), served Sweden in the Thirty Years' War and built the castle of Manorhamilton, County Leitrim, Ireland

—and at least one daughter:
Margaret (died 1623), married William Douglas, 1st Marquess of Douglas

Later years 
In 1562 his eldest brother, James, was declared insane. His father died at Hamilton on 22 January 1575. His brother James as the eldest inherited the title and estate but because of his insanity, John, the second brother, had to stand in for him.

Then in 1579, the privy council decided to arrest both him and his brother, Lord John Hamilton (afterwards 1st Marquess of Hamilton), to punish them for their past misdeeds. They were besieged at Hamilton. The brothers escaped to the Kingdom of England, where Queen Elizabeth used them as pawns in the diplomatic game, and later Claud lived for a short time in France.

In 1580 he is received into the Catholic church by Frater James Tyrie.

In April 1583 Claud was in exile in England at Widdrington Castle in Northumberland. He wrote to Queen Elizabeth and Frances Walsingham for aid for his expenses living in this "sober house" especially as his wife was soon to visit.

Returning to Scotland in 1586 and meddling again in politics, he sought to reconcile James VI of Scotland with his mother; he was in communication with Philip II of Spain in the interests of Mary and the Roman Catholic religion, and neither the failure of Anthony Babington's plot nor even the defeat of the Spanish Armada put an end to these intrigues.

In 1587 he was created a Scottish Lord of Parliament as Lord Paisley, when the abbey was erected as a barony. With this the Hamilton family gained a second seat in Parliament, the first being held by his elder brother John for his eldest brother James, during his insanity. This seat in the Scottish Parliament was occupied after his death by his grandson James, the 2nd Earl of Abercorn and Lord Paysley became a subsidiary title of the earls, later marquesses and dukes of Abercorn, which was held by the heir apparent.

Illness, death, and timeline 
In 1589 some of his letters were seized and Lord Paisley, as he was now, suffered a short imprisonment, after which he practically disappeared from public life. He suffered from mental illness in his later years. In November 1590 he broke down in tears after reading the Bible and it was thought he would not recover 'in regard of the infirmity haunting and falling on many descended of that house'. His eldest brother James Hamilton, 3rd Earl of Arran, had been suffering from a mental illness since 1562. In 1598 he allowed James, his eldest son, styled the Master of Paisley, to act on his behalf with regard to all the affairs concerning the town. His wife died in March 1616. His son predeceased him in 1618. He died in 1621 and was buried in Paisley Abbey. He was succeeded by his grandson, James Hamilton, 2nd Earl of Abercorn.

Notes and references

Notes

Citations

Sources 

  – 1547 to 1563
  – 1574 to 1581
  – 1589 to 1593
  (for details on his siblings and children)
 
 
  – Ab-Adam to Basing
 
  – (for timeline)
  
 
  – Viscounts
 
  – Abercorn to Balmerino (for Lord Paisley)
  – Fife to Hyndford (for Hamilton)
  – Sumerville to Winton (for Seton, earl of Winton)
 

Hamilton, Claud, 1st Lord Paisley
Hamilton, Claud, 1st Lord Paisley
16th-century Scottish people
17th-century Scottish people
Court of Mary, Queen of Scots
Claud
Paisley, Claud Hamilton, 1st Lord
Paisley, Claud Hamilton, 1st Lord
Paisley
People associated with Renfrewshire
Younger sons of earls